"Roll On Big Mama" is a song written by Dan Darst, and recorded by American country music artist Joe Stampley.  It was released January 1975 as the first single from the album Joe Stampley.  The song was Stampley's second number one on the country chart.  The single stayed at number one for one week and spent a total of ten weeks on the country chart.  The song was written by Dan Darst.

Song Background
The song is one of many, in the country genre, that salute the American truck driver.

Charts

Weekly charts

Year-end charts

References
 

1975 singles
Joe Stampley songs
Song recordings produced by Norro Wilson
Epic Records singles
1975 songs
Songs about truck driving